The 2009 Cyclus Open de Tênis was a professional tennis tournament played on outdoor red clay courts. It was the fourth edition of the tournament which was part of the 2009 ATP Challenger Tour. It took place in Florianópolis, Brazil between 19 and 25 October 2009.

ATP entrants

Seeds

 Rankings are as of October 12, 2009.

Other entrants
The following players received wildcards into the singles main draw:
  Thiago Alves
  Guilherme Clézar
  Gastón Gaudio
  Valter Mori Filho

The following players received entry from the qualifying draw:
  Andre Begemann
  André Miele
  Andrés Molteni
  Franko Škugor

Champions

Singles

 Guillaume Rufin def.  Pere Riba, 6–4, 3–6, 6–3

Doubles

 Tomasz Bednarek /  Mateusz Kowalczyk def.  Daniel Gimeno Traver /  Pere Riba, 6–4, 3–6, 6–3

External links
Official website
ITF Search 
2009 Draws

Cyclus Open de Tenis
Clay court tennis tournaments
Tennis tournaments in Brazil
Aberto de Florianópolis
Cyclus Open de Tenis